Gudrun Klaus-Dittmar is an East German sprint canoer who competed in the late 1970s. She won two medals at the 1977 ICF Canoe Sprint World Championships with a gold in the K-1 500 m event and a silver in the K-4 500 m event.

References

East German female canoeists
Living people
Year of birth missing (living people)
ICF Canoe Sprint World Championships medalists in kayak